Tsar Samuil Stadium is a multi-purpose stadium in Petrich, Bulgaria.  It is currently used mostly for football matches and is the home ground of PFC Belasitsa Petrich.  The stadium holds 9,500 spectators.

The stadium is named after legendary Bulgarian medieval ruler Tsar Samuil.

PFC Belasitsa Petrich
Football venues in Bulgaria
Multi-purpose stadiums in Bulgaria
Buildings and structures in Blagoevgrad Province